Vi is a locality situated on Alnön in Sundsvall Municipality, Västernorrland County, Sweden with 4,997 inhabitants in 2010.

References 

Populated places in Sundsvall Municipality
Medelpad